The Pourvoyeuse class was a type of heavy frigates of the French Navy, designed in the 1770s by Louis Boux. The class comprise two units, Pourvoyeuse and Consolante, which served in the Indian Ocean and were involved in the naval operations of the American Revolutionary War, notably serving in the squadron of Admiral de Suffren.

They constituted one of the earliest attempts at building a frigate armed with 24-pounders on the artillery deck, rather than the 18-pounders typical of the day. The attempt was unfruitful, and the ships were commissioned armed with old 18-pounders. The concept was eventually perfected with the original six frigates of the United States Navy, before becoming moot with the introduction of a different artillery system based on 30-pounder long guns and 30-pounder short guns in the 1820s.

Pourvoyeuse
Builder: Lorient 
Ordered: 6 February 1772
Launched: 10 November 1772
Completed: 1773
Fate: Broken up

Consolante
Builder: Lorient
Ordered: 
Launched: 26 June 1775
Completed: 
Fate:

References

Notes

Bibliography 

 Rif Winfield, British Warships in the Age of Sail, 1714-1792, Seaforth Publishing, 2008, .

 
Frigate classes